8vo was a London-based graphic design firm formed in 1985 by Simon Johnston, Mark Holt and Hamish Muir. It closed in July 2001.

Notable designs
8vo produced the artwork for many Factory Records records sleeves and promotional material. 8vo produced sleeves for music for the band Durutti Column including Say What You Mean, Mean What You Say, Domo Arigato, Circuses and Bread, Valuable Passages , When the World , The Guitar and Other Machines  and Obey the Time .

Octavo magazine
8vo produced eight issues of Octavo – a magazine with a heavy structural, typographic aesthetic from 1986 to 1992 (the last issue was released as a CD-ROM).

Notes
 8vo: On the Outside, by Mark Holt and Hamish Muir, Lars Müller Publishers, 2005.
 Eye, Number 37, Volume 10, Autumn 2000.

References

External links
8vo On CerysmaticFactory
Creative Digital Designs
Motion Design Agency

Graphic design studios
Business services companies of England
Defunct companies based in London
Design companies established in 1985
1985 establishments in England